Miss Grand Paraguay 2019 was the 3rd edition of the Miss Grand Paraguay pageant, held on July 29, 2019, at the Marshal Convention Center, Asunción. Sixteen national aspirants either chosen through regional pageant or central casting competed for the title, of whom the representative of Itapúa, Milena Rodríguez, was named the winner. She later represented Paraguay at the Miss Grand International 2019 pageant in Venezuela, was placed among the top 20 finalists.

Results

Contestants
16 contestants competed for the title.

References

External links

 

Miss Grand Paraguay
Beauty pageants in Paraguay
Paraguayan awards
Grand Paraguay